Tonazzi may refer to: 

 Laëtitia Tonazzi (born 1981), a French football player
 Marco Tonazzi (born 1961), Italian former alpine skier

 Kio Ene-Tonazzi-DMT, a professional continental road bicycle racing team based in Italy,

See also 
 Toni